The SAT Subject Test in Spanish (formerly known as the SAT II) was a standardized test given by the College Board that assessed fluency in Spanish among high school students. It was typically taken after three to four years of studying the language, once the student had reached a significantly level of understanding and competence in it. The test also partially emphasized preparation for AP Spanish and/or Spanish as a course in College. Passage selections were drawn from prose fiction, historical works, and newspaper and magazine articles, as well as advertisements, flyers and letters.

On January 19 2021, the College Board discontinued all SAT Subject tests, including the SAT Subject Test in Spanish. This was effective immediately in the United States, and the tests were to be phased out by the following summer for international students. This was done as a response to changes in college admissions due to the impact of the COVID-19 pandemic on education.

Test
The test was one hour long and was composed of 85 multiple choice questions. It was scored on a scale from 200 to 800, as were all SAT Subject Tests. This test was offered five times annually and did not include a listening section, which could be found on a separate but similar test, the SAT Subject Test in Spanish with Listening. The listening test was only offered once every year.

According to the College Board, the three overall topics on the test were evenly divided among the 85 questions, with each comprising about a third of the test. They were as follows:
 Vocabulary and Structure
 Paragraph Comprehension
 Reading Comprehension

The College Board listed multiple anticipated skills for taking the test, as follows:
 Knowledge of words that represent different parts of speech along with some basic expressions within culturally appropriate contexts.
 Ability to select appropriate grammatically correct words and/or expressions in order to complete a sentence. A section of the test contains vocabulary and structure questions embedded within longer paragraphs.
 Understanding of similar points (as main and supporting ideas, themes, style, tone, and the spatial and temporal settings) of a passage.

Scoring
This test was no different from any other SAT Subject Test in language, so all "standard scoring methods" applied, including:
 Each correct answer is worth 1 point
 Each answer left blank neither adds nor deducts points to the score
 Each incorrect answer subtracts 0.25 points away from the final grade

It was possible to get a perfect score on the exam while leaving some answers blank, depending on how well one did on each section.

The mean score on this test was a 653. 18,161 students took the test in 2016.

References

Spanish